

Incumbents
President: Mariano Melgarejo until January 15, Agustín Morales

Events

Births

Deaths
November 23 - Mariano Melgarejo (assassinated in Lima, Peru)

References

 
1870s in Bolivia
Years of the 19th century in Bolivia